Ali Akbarnejad (born 16 September 1967) is an Iranian former wrestler who competed in the 1992 Summer Olympics.

References

1967 births
Living people
Olympic wrestlers of Iran
Wrestlers at the 1992 Summer Olympics
Iranian male sport wrestlers
Asian Games gold medalists for Iran
Asian Games bronze medalists for Iran
Asian Games medalists in wrestling
Wrestlers at the 1986 Asian Games
Wrestlers at the 1994 Asian Games
Medalists at the 1986 Asian Games
Medalists at the 1994 Asian Games
20th-century Iranian people
21st-century Iranian people